Events from the year 1101 in Ireland.

Incumbents
High King of Ireland: Domnall Ua Lochlainn

Events
Muirchertach Ua Briain of the Dál gCais proclaims himself High King of Ireland.
At the Synod of Cashel, Muirchertach Ua Briain grants Cashel to the church as the seat of a metropolitan bishop.
Muirchertach Ua Briain destroys the ringfort at Grianan of Aileach.
Sailors from overseas raid Scattery Island.
Gillafin mac Coulahan, King of Síol Anmchadha, is killed and succeeded by his predecessor's son, Diarmaid Ua Madadhan.

Deaths
Gilla na Naemh Ua Dunabhra, Chief Poet of Connacht.

References